Karahrud (also Romanized as Karahrūd and Karehrūd; also known as Kararūt and Qara Rūd) was a city in the Central District of Arak County, Markazi Province, Iran.  At the 2006 census, its population was 23,399, in 6,209 families. The city was reorganized as part of Arak, becoming Arak Municipality district 4. It is the birthplace of Kurdish historian and prince of Bidlîs, Sharaf Khan Bidlisi (1543-ca. 1603).

References

Populated places in Arak County

Cities in Markazi Province